Marina Iqbal (born 7 March 1987) is a Pakistani cricket commentator and former cricketer. She played as a right-arm medium-fast bowler and right-handed batter. She appeared in 36 One Day Internationals and 42 Twenty20 Internationals for Pakistan between 2009 and 2017. She played domestic cricket for Lahore, Zarai Taraqiati Bank Limited, Punjab, Omar Associates, Saif Sports Saga and State Bank of Pakistan.

Career

One Day Internationals
Iqbal made her One Day International debut against Ireland in May 2009 at Dublin.

Twenty20 Internationals
Iqbal made her Twenty20 Internationals debut against Ireland in May 2009 at Dublin.

2010
Marina was part of the Pakistan team at the 2010 Asian Games in China which won gold.

References

External links
 
 

1987 births
Living people
Cricketers from Lahore
Pakistani women cricketers
Pakistan women One Day International cricketers
Pakistan women Twenty20 International cricketers
Lahore women cricketers
Zarai Taraqiati Bank Limited women cricketers
Punjab (Pakistan) women cricketers
Omar Associates women cricketers
Saif Sports Saga women cricketers
State Bank of Pakistan women cricketers
Pakistani cricket commentators
Women cricket commentators
Asian Games gold medalists for Pakistan
Asian Games medalists in cricket
Cricketers at the 2010 Asian Games
Cricketers at the 2014 Asian Games
Medalists at the 2010 Asian Games
Medalists at the 2014 Asian Games